Indraprastha Apollo Hospital is an Indian hospital owned by Apollo Hospitals group, India's largest healthcare chain. Established in 1995, it is the third super specialty tertiary care hospital set by the Apollo Hospitals Group, jointly with the Government of Delhi. It is a 695-bed hospital, with the provision for expansion to 1000 beds in future. The hospital is spread over 15 acres, and has a built-up area of 600,000 square feet.

History
The first successful pediatric and adult liver transplants in India were performed at Indraprastha Apollo Hospital in November 1998.

Indraprastha Apollo Hospital was accredited by Joint Commission International (JCI) USA as the first internationally accredited Hospital in India in 2005 and South Asia. In 2011, the hospital got re-accredited by JCI for a fourth time consequently, making it the first hospital in India to do so.

The Apollo Heart Institutes at Indraprastha Apollo Hospital is part of one of the largest cardiovascular groups in the world with over 1,70,000 heart surgeries, which include complicated coronary artery bypass operations, surgery for all types of valvular heart disease, and infant and neonatal heart surgery – with success rates comparable to international standards.

Services

Specialties and treatment offered by the Indraprastha Apollo Hospital  

Anaesthesiology
Apollo Centre of Advanced Pediatrics
Bone Marrow Transplant
Cosmetic & Plastic Surgery
Dental Clinic
Dermatology (Skin)
Department of Elder Care
Department of Neonatology
Department of General & Advance Laparoscopic Surgery
Department of Pediatric Urology & Pediatric Surgery
Endocrinology
ENT (Ear, Nose, Throat)
Fetal Medicine
Gastroenterology & GI Surgery
Gynecology & Obstetrics
Heart Institutes
Infertility Care (IVF)
Institutes of Critical Care
Institutes of Bariatric
Institutes of Cancer
Institutes of Emergency
Institutes of Nephrology
Institutes of Neurosciences
Institutes of Orthopedics
Institutes of Robotic Surgery
Institutes of Spine
Institutes of Transplant
Internal Medicine
Nuclear Medicine
Ophthalmology
Psychiatry & Clinical Psychology
Radiology / Radio Diagnosis
Rheumatology
Urology & Andrology
Vascular & Endovascular Surgery

References

External links
 

Hospital buildings completed in 1996
Hospitals in Delhi
Hospitals established in 1996
Apollo Hospitals
1996 establishments in Delhi
20th-century architecture in India